Design Hotels comprises more than 300 independent, design-driven hotels located around the globe. The company was founded in 1993 as a California Corporation, Design Hotels Inc., by J. Peter Schweitzer and Claus Sendlinger. In 2004, after several relocations of its headquarters from Arizona, California, to New York, New York, the firm settled its headquarters in its current location in Berlin, Germany, under the name Design Hotels AG. In 2011, Starwood Hotels & Resorts acquired 72% ownership of Design Hotels AG. Following the merger of Starwood Hotels & Resorts and Marriott International, Marriott International currently owns 100% of the company, now known as Design Hotels GmbH

Philosophy
The Design Hotels portfolio is formed by privately owned and operated hotels that reflect the "vision of independent hoteliers". A strong emphasis is placed on "culturally rooted hospitality experiences" and "leading-edge design and architecture".

History
Design Hotels was founded in 1993 as a California Corporation, Design Hotels Inc. by J. Peter Schweitzer and Claus Sendlinger. Claus was a part-owner (with Hans Peter Knodler and Oliver Jamitzky) of German full-service travel agency CO-ORDINATES GmbH, based in Augsburg, Germany; the two firms, and several others, consolidated in 1998 under the holding company lebensart.net GmbH, subsequently known as lebensart Global Networks AG in 1999. The holding company went public in Germany on Dec. 10, 1999.

In 2000 lebensart Global Networks AG, with Daniel Adams as the CFO raised sufficient capital to transfer trading from the over-the-counter (OTC) markets to the Börse München.

In 2001 the firm re-branded itself as Design Hotels with 23 initial member hotels. That same year the firm completed the corporate merger of wholly owned subsidiaries ResExpress, Inc., Younger Direct Marketing, Inc., and lebensart technology, Inc. The company began trading under the name lebensart technology Arizona, Inc., with headquarters in Scottsdale, Arizona.

In 2004, after several relocations of its headquarters from Arizona, California, to New York City, the firm settled its headquarters in its current location in Berlin, Germany, under the name Design Hotels AG.

In 2011, Starwood Hotels & Resorts acquired 72% ownership of Design Hotels AG. Following the merger of Starwood Hotels & Resorts and Marriott International, Marriott International acquired 100% of Design Hotels GmbH.

Membership and Services
Design Hotels services its member hotels in a number of ways, including brand management, PR and communications, creative design, digital commerce, content marketing, and social media, utilizing its relationships within the international media landscape and with social influencers. The Business model of Design Hotels GmbH relies on 3 principal sources of income: 1. implementation fees, annual license fees; 2. transaction fees; 3. marketing and consulting services.

Services include sales, marketing, PR and other creative services; online and telephone booking services, with associated customer service; yield revenue management and third-party business development deals; and hotel consultancy.

References 

Hotel and leisure companies of Germany
Companies based in Berlin
Hospitality companies established in 1993
Marriott International brands